Surfing in Peru includes Máncora, the largest left-hand point break in the world, located on the northern coast. A less crowded wave in Máncora is the so-called Punta Ballenas which is located south of the main stretch of the beach. The longest left-handed wave in the world is at Puerto Chicama, which is over 4 km.

Competitions 
Peru is host to several international surf competitions including; The Peru International Surfing Championship, The World Surfing Championship (1965), and The Peru National Surf Circuit.

References